Landmark sites in Singapore refers to a specific set of sites selected by the Urban Redevelopment Authority which are given greater design and planning flexibility to encourage the erection of architecturally distinctive buildings or structures. These sites may involve existing buildings, old buildings slated for redevelopment, or empty plots to be developed in the future.

The current list of landmark sites include:

References 

 
Lists of buildings and structures in Singapore
Singapore geography-related lists